The 2013 Danmark Rundt was a men's road bicycle race held from 31 July to 4 August 2013. It was the 23rd edition of the men's stage race, which was established in 1985. The race was rated as a 2.HC event and formed part of the 2013 UCI Europe Tour.

The race was won by Dutch rider Wilco Kelderman of the Belkin Pro Cycling Team with Danish riders Lars Bak of Lotto–Belisol and Matti Breschel of Team Saxo–Tinkoff finishing second and third.

It featured sixteen teams, including seven UCI Pro teams.

Schedule

Teams
16 teams raced in the 2013 Danmark Rundt: 7 UCI ProTeams, 5 UCI Professional Continental Teams, 4 UCI Continental Teams along with a Danish national team under the Team Post Danmark name.

Classification leadership

Final standings
The general classification was won by Wilco Kelderman of Belkin Pro Cycling Team by six seconds from Lars Bak of Lotto–Belisol with Matti Breschel of Team Saxo–Tinkoff another nine seconds behind in third place. Kelderman also won the points jersey by two points from Breschel and the young riders award. The race was Kelderman's first professional tour victory.

Danish rider Martin Mortensen of Riwal Cycling Team won the mountain classification and the fighters award. The team race was won by Bardiani Valvole–CSF Inox by 16 seconds from Vacansoleil–DCM.

References

External links
Official site (Danish)

Danmark Rundt
Danmark Rundt
2013 in Danish sport